No. 18 Sector RAF is a former Royal Air Force Sector that was operational during both the First and the Second World Wars.

First World War

18th (Training) Wing was formed on 25 March 1916 in London controlling airfields within London. It joined Eastern Group Command on 10 January 1917 and moved to various locations within London until 7 August 1919 when it moved to Ford Junction and was disbanded on 1 October 1919.

Second World War

No. 18 (Polish) (Fighter) Wing RAF was formed during December 1943 at RAF Northolt controlling:
 No. 131 Airfield RAF
 No. 133 Airfield RAF
 No. 135 Airfield RAF (from 10 April 1944)
The wing was disbanded on 12 May 1944.

No. 18 (Fighter) Sector was formed on 12 May 1944 at RAF Chailey controlling:
 No. 131 Wing RAF
 No. 133 Wing RAF
 No. 135 Wing RAF
The sector disbanded still at Chailey on 12 July 1944.

See also
 List of wings of the Royal Air Force

References

Citations

Bibliography

Sector 18